Austrocordulia territoria is a species of dragonfly in the family Austrocorduliidae,
commonly known as the Top End hawk. 
It is a medium-sized, black and yellow dragonfly,
endemic to coastal Northern Territory, Australia, where it inhabits streams.

Gallery

Note
There is uncertainty about which family Austrocordulia territoria best belongs to: Austrocorduliidae, Synthemistidae, or Corduliidae.

See also
 List of Odonata species of Australia

References

Austrocorduliidae
Odonata of Australia
Endemic fauna of Australia
Taxa named by Günther Theischinger
Taxa named by J.A.L. (Tony) Watson
Insects described in 1978